Robert Stratil (1919 – 1976) was a German art director. Born in Ostrava of Sudeten German heritage, he fled Czechoslovakia following World War II and settled in Munich where he worked at the Bavaria Studios.

Selected filmography
 Sky Without Stars (1955)
 Once a Greek (1956)
 Rose Bernd (1957)
 The Doctor of Stalingrad (1957)
 The Crammer (1958)
 Dorothea Angermann (1959)
 You Don't Shoot at Angels (1960)
 The Black Sheep (1960)
 A Woman for Life (1960)
 One, Two, Three (1961)
 A Mission for Mr. Dodd (1964)
 Love Nights in the Taiga (1967)

References

Bibliography
 Greco, Joseph. The File on Robert Siodmak in Hollywood, 1941-1951. Universal-Publishers, 1999.

External links

1919 births
1976 deaths
German art directors
Film people from Ostrava
Sudeten German people